Romeo Jajuan Weems (born June 9, 2001) is an American professional basketball player for the Memphis Hustle of the NBA G League. He played college basketball for the DePaul Blue Demons.

Early life and high school career
Weems grew up in Detroit, Michigan and attended New Haven High School in New Haven, Michigan, where he was a four-year starter on the basketball team. As a freshman in 2015–16, he started in all 25 games and averaged 16 points, 10.7 rebounds, 5.1 assists, 4 steals and 1.8 blocks to help his team to a 22–3 record, a regional championship and the state Class B quarterfinals. As a sophomore in 2016–17, he started in all 28 games and averaged 18.1 points, 11.8 rebounds, 3.6 assists, 3.7 steals and 3.2 blocks to help his team to a 27–1 record, a second-straight regional title and a Class B state title. He averaged 23.5 points, 10.8 rebounds, 5.3 assists, 4.8 steals and 2 blocks per game and was named All-Michigan by USA Today in his junior season. As a senior, Weems averaged 27.9 points, 11.4 rebounds, 4.2 steals, 3.5 assists and 2.6 blocks per game and was named the Associated Press Division 2 Player of the Year and Mr. Basketball of Michigan. Weems finished his high school career with 2,151 points scored. Weems was considered to be a Top 50 recruit in his class and committed to playing college basketball for DePaul over offers from Michigan, Michigan State, Ohio State and Oregon.

College career
As a freshman, Weems averaged 8 points, 1.7 assists, 4.9 rebounds and 1.3 steals per game and was named to the Big East Conference All-Freshman team. He was named the conference Freshman of the Week after a nine-point, five-rebound, three-block game in a 93–78 victory over Iowa on November 11, 2019, and scoring nine points with eight rebounds and four assists in a 75–54 win against Cornell on November 16, 2019. Weems repeated as Freshman of the Week after scoring 17 points, 11 rebounds, three steals and two assists in a 72–67 win over Boston College. As a sophomore, Weems averaged 7.3 points and 5 rebounds per game. On April 7, 2021, he declared for the 2021 NBA draft, forgoing his remaining college eligibility.

Professional career

Memphis Hustle (2021–present)
After going undrafted in the 2021 NBA draft, Weems joined the Memphis Grizzlies for the 2021 NBA Summer League and on October 8, he signed with the Grizzlies. However, he was waived on October 15. On October 23, he signed with the Memphis Hustle as an affiliate player.

National team career
Weems played for United States National Team as they won the 2017 FIBA Under-16 Americas Championship. He was a starter for Team USA and averaged 8.6 points and 8.1 rebounds per game when they won the 2018 FIBA U17 World Cup.

Career statistics

College

|-
| style="text-align:left;"| 2019–20
| style="text-align:left;"| DePaul
| 32 || 32 || 30.1 || .427 || .365 || .607 || 4.9 || 1.7 || 1.3 || .8 || 8.0
|-
| style="text-align:left;"| 2020–21
| style="text-align:left;"| DePaul
| 18 || 15 || 28.6 || .376 || .366 || .696 || 5.0 || .9 || 1.3 || .6 || 7.3
|- class="sortbottom"
| style="text-align:center;" colspan="2"| Career
| 50 || 47 || 29.5 || .408 || .365 || .633 || 4.9 || 1.4 || 1.3 || .7 || 7.7

References

External links
DePaul Blue Demons bio
USA Basketball bio

2001 births
Living people
American men's basketball players
Basketball players from Detroit
DePaul Blue Demons men's basketball players
Memphis Hustle players
Power forwards (basketball)